Purushamedha (or Naramedha) is a Śrauta ritual of human sacrifice. The Vajasaneyi Samhita-Sataphana Brahmana-Katyayana Srauta Sutra sequence of Shukla Yajur Veda texts contains the most details.

Whether actual human sacrifice was taking place has been debated since Colebrooke brought the issue under attention in 1805. He regarded it as a symbolic ritual. Since there is no inscriptural or other record of Purushamedha ever being performed, some scholars suggest it was invented simply to round out sacrificial possibilities. Asko Parpola suggests actual human sacrifices are described in Vedic texts, while the Brahmanas show the practice diminishing. In Shatapatha Brahmana 13.6.2, an ethereal voice intervenes to halt the proceedings.
The dhatupatha of Aṣṭādhyāyī by Pāṇini defines the root medha as synergizing the energy to perform something fruitful.

Historical development

During the Vedic period 

Scholars doubt the Purushamedha was ever performed. However, according to Jan Houben, the actual occurrence of human sacrifice would be difficult to prove, since the relevant pieces of evidence would be small in number.

Rise of Sramanic religions 

According to Jan Houben, the Later Vedic period was followed by a period of embarrassment about violence in rituals. This period corresponds to the rise of Sramanic religions such as Buddhism and Jainism, both of which place emphasis on nonviolence (ahimsa). This period also corresponds to the composition of the Shatapatha Brahmana, which states that the victims of a Purushamedha are supposed to be released, and the composition of the Chandogya Upanishad, which lists nonviolence as a virtue.

Mimamsa movement 

According to Jan Houben, the Sramanic period was followed by another period where Vedic ritualists tried to defend their actions against Buddhist and Jain criticism. This period corresponds to the rise of the Mīmāṃsā school of philosophy, which claimed that the Vedas were the sole authority regarding matters of dharma.

 Medieval period 
By the 10th century, the Purushamedha was included in lists of Kali-varjyas, or actions which were prohibited for the Kali Yuga. This suggests that human sacrifice had become obsolete by the time the texts were composed. However, it also suggests that the Purushamedha may have in some cases consummated with the actual sacrificing of a human. That is, the existence of inclusion of the prohibition in the list of Kali-varjyas demonstrates that at least one author seriously feared the possibility that a ritual practitioner might take the description of the ritual as a moral license to perform the rite to the extent of murder and cannibalism. This is a plausible reason to include it in the list of Kali-varjyas, even if it was a purely symbolic ceremony during the period of the composition of the Śatapatha Brāhmaṇa. Whether or not the rite ever consummated in the slaughter of a human and the consumption of their flesh, however, remains so far a matter of scholarly speculation.

 Performance in Hindu epics 
The Aitareya Brahmana tells the story of a sacrifice carried out by King Harischandra. The childless king asked Varuna to provide him with a son, and in return, Varuna asks him to sacrifice the child to him. Harischandra delays the performance of the sacrifice and allows his son, named Rohita, to grow older. Eventually, Rohita wanders into the forest to find a substitute for himself. He comes across a poor Brahmin named Ajigarta, who sells his son Sunahsepa to him. Sunahsepa is bound to the stake, but he frees himself by reciting some mantras that were taught to him by Vishvamitra. This story is reproduced in the Bhagavata Purana.

 In Vedanta and the Puranas 
Human sacrifice and cannibalism are explicitly condemned in the Bhagavata Purana (5.26.31). The Chandogya Upanishad (3.16) states that the Purushamedha is actually a metaphor for life itself, and it compares the various stages of life to the oblations that are offered.

 Views 
Helmer Ringgren regarded that the traces of Purushameda are not clearly detectable.

Dayananda Saraswati, founder of Arya Samaj has rejected any kind of human or animal sacrifice in vaidika yagñas.

In November 2000, a modern version of Purushamedha was organised by All World Gayatri Pariwar at Shantikunj Haridwar, marking the completion of 12 year Yugsandhi Mahapurascharana. In this program, named Srijan Sankalp Vibhuti Mahayagya, participants had to tie themselves with Yup and take an oath to dedicate their life to social causes as a sacrifice. Yagya was performed on 1551  on the bank of the Ganges and was attended by four million devotees.

 See also 
 Historical Vedic religion

Notes

References

Sources
Printed sources

 
 Parpola, A. 'Human Sacrifice in India in Vedic Times and Before' in Bremmer, J.N. (2007): The Strange World of Human Sacrifice'', Peeters

Web sources

Hindu rituals
Human sacrifice